The sustainable yield of natural capital is the ecological yield that can be extracted without reducing the base of capital itself, i.e. the surplus required to maintain ecosystem services at the same or increasing level over time. The term only refers to resources that are renewable in nature as extracting non-renewable resources will always diminish the natural capital. The sustainable yield of a given resource will generally vary over time with the needs of the ecosystem to maintain itself, e.g. a forest that has recently suffered a blight or flooding or fire will require more of its own ecological yield to sustain and re-establish a mature forest.  While doing so, the sustainable yield may be much less. The term sustainable yield is most commonly used in forestry, fisheries, and groundwater applications.

Sustainable yield is an important component of sustainable forest management. In the forestry context it is the largest amount of harvest activity that can occur without degrading the productivity of the stock. The idea of sustainable yield of forests had shifted focus from only output, to include maintaining production capacity and maintaining the natural renewal capacity of forest vegetation

This concept is important in fishery management, in which sustainable yield is defined as the number of fish that can be extracted without reducing the base of fish stock, and the maximum sustainable yield is defined as the amount of fish that can be extracted under given environmental conditions. In fisheries, the basic natural capital or virgin population, must decrease with extraction. At the same time productivity increases. Hence, sustainable yield would be within the range in which the natural capital together with its production are able to provide satisfactory yield. It may be very difficult to quantify sustainable yield, because every dynamic ecological conditions and other factors  not  related to harvesting induce changes and fluctuations in both, the natural capital and its productivity.

In the case of groundwater there is a safe yield of water extraction per unit time, beyond which the aquifer risks the state of overdrafting or even depletion.

See also
 Sustainable yield in fisheries
 Maximum sustainable yield
 Hans Carl von Carlowitz, who pioneered the mathematics behind sustained yield with his 1713 treatise

References

Notes 

Environmental conservation
Renewable resources